
Norfolk Island competed at the 1994 Commonwealth Games in Victoria, British Columbia.

Medals

Gold
none

Silver
none

Bronze
Carmen Anderson — Bowls, Women's Singles

See also
Sport in Norfolk Island

References

External links

Norfolk Island at the Commonwealth Games
Nations at the 1994 Commonwealth Games
1994 in Norfolk Island
1994 in Australian sport